The Trío Matamoros was one of the most popular Cuban trova groups. It was formed in 1925 by Miguel Matamoros (8 May 1894 in Santiago de Cuba – 15 April 1971; guitar), Rafael Cueto (14 March 1900 in Santiago de Cuba – 7 August 1991; guitar) and Siro Rodríguez (9 December 1899 in Santiago de Cuba – Regla, 29 March 1981; maracas and claves). All three were singers and composers. The group was originally called Trio Oriental, but changed their name to Trio Matamoros in 1928 upon the discovery that another group already claimed the Trio Oriental name.

The Trío Matamoros played boleros and son. They toured all Latin America and Europe and recorded in New York. In 1940 Guillermo Portabales performed with the trio. Matamoros expanded the trio into a conjunto (Conjunto Matamoros) for a trip to Mexico and hired the young Beny Moré as singer from 1945 to 1947. They recorded many 78 rpm records and LPs; some of their output is available on CDs. The group were renowned for the harmony of their voices, and the quality of the lyrics.

The group is considered a "seminal group in the rise of 'son'." Throughout the nearly four decades that it was active, the group re-configured itself into many musical variations and acts as a quartet, septet, orchestra, etc.

Miguel Matamoros was one of the greatest and most prolific composers of Cuban son. His first hit was "El que siembra su maíz" (He who sows his corn), followed by classics such as "Lágrimas negras" (Black tears) and "Son de la Loma." The group, whose members stayed together for 35 years, announced their disbandment in May 1961. Their last concert had taken place in New York the year before.

References

External links
 Trío Matamoros recordings at the Discography of American Historical Recordings.

Cuban musical groups
Son cubano groups
Cuban singer-songwriters
20th-century Cuban male singers
People from Santiago de Cuba